The 20th World Scout Jamboree took place in the naval base in Sattahip, Thailand between 28 December 2002 and 8 January 2003 - the 62nd anniversary of the death of Lord Baden-Powell, the founder of the Scout Movement. It was the second World Jamboree to be held in Southeast Asia after the Philippines hosted the event in 1959.

The Jamboree provided an opportunity for 30,000 Scouts from all over the world to spend 12 days camping together and attend activities designed for them in self-development and social responsibility, within the framework of the educational Scout method. The Jamboree fostered the progress and unity of World Scout Movement and strongly linked it to Asian culture, both in terms of activities, mainly Thai dancing, and method .

The theme of the 20th World Scout Jamboree was Share our World, Share our Cultures.

As with previous Jamborees, the standard troop size was 36 youths plus 4 adult leaders.

The camp site was located on a beach on the Gulf of Thailand, covering  and consisting of flat plains, foothills, and a white sandy beach.

The emblem shows a typical Thai roof. The A-shaped gables in the roof represent Thailand's development of traditions and cultures and the sharing of these traditions from generation to generation.

At the Closing Ceremony, a recorded message from The Hon. Betty Clay (née Baden-Powell), then 85, the younger daughter of the Founder, was broadcast.

References

External links
 https://web.archive.org/web/20160303232912/http://www.thaiwaysmagazine.com/thai_article/1918_world_scout/world_scout.html
 https://web.archive.org/web/20071010192208/http://www.13th.org.uk/jamboree/jamboree.htm

2003

December 2002 events in Thailand
January 2003 events in Thailand
2002 in Thailand
2003 in Thailand